Espresso Bongo is the second studio album released by Mental As Anything. It was released in July 1980, and peaked at #37 on the Australian Album charts.

Recording
Greedy Smith later said the recording, "just got away from us all together. We'd only learned the songs the week before we recorded them, and then we put them down in seven days."

O'Doherty later recalled, "we did it in six days under the influence of all sorts of terrible things. It's one of my favourites and it's the weirdest album we've done but it could have been played a lot better and done a lot cleaner."

Reception
AllMusic said, "Sounding like it consists of songs leftover from the sessions for their debut, Espresso Bongo does no one any favors, although it is not a bad album. Cameron Allan's production is even flatter than before, sucking almost all the excitement out of what could have been an exciting album." The efforts of Martin Plaza are described as "buried".

Rip It Up said "The hooks are just as subtle, but growing songwriting expertise and excellent production mean that the sound is smoother, and the band no longer wear their influences like badges". The subject matter was said to be, "that great Australian institution, suburbia".

Track listing 
Side A
 "Troop Movements in the Ukraine"
 "Semi Trailer"
 "Missing Plane"
 "Insect Liberation"
 "Won't Let Me Drive"
 "Come Around"
Side B
 "Harmonic Visions"
 "Away"
 "Cannibal"
 "Blacktown to Bondi"
 "The Girl"
 "Live Now Pay Later"

Personnel

Musicians
 Martin Plaza — lead vocals, guitar    
 Greedy Smith — lead vocals, keyboards, harmonica
 Reg Mombassa — guitar, vocals  
 Peter O'Doherty — bass, guitar, vocals 
 Wayne de Lisle – drums

Recording details
 Cameron Allan — Producer
 Jim Blackfoot — Engineer

Charts

Certifications and sales

Release history

References

1980 albums
Mental As Anything albums
Regular Records albums